Giorgio Bassi (born 20 January 1934 in Milan) is a former Formula One driver from Italy who raced in the 1965 Italian Grand Prix for the Scuderia Centro Sud team. He was also a regular participant in Italian Formula 3 and took a class win in the 1965 Targa Florio in a 1-litre ASA Prototype.

Complete Formula One results
(key)

References
Profile at grandprix.com

1934 births
Living people
Racing drivers from Milan
Italian Formula One drivers
24 Hours of Le Mans drivers
Scuderia Centro Sud Formula One drivers